William Catalano, Jr. (July 9, 1934 – July 15, 2005) was an American jazz trumpet player who performed with Stan Kenton And His Orchestra in the late 1950s, appearing on at least 30 original recordings as well new compilations from Capitol, Omega, Playboy Records, and Verve. After returning to his hometown of San Francisco, he resumed playing the local scene as a side musician, bandleader, and musical contractor, hiring local musicians for numerous touring performers and shows. Alongside his performing career he was an educator for 41 years, teaching music to middle school and high school students in San Francisco. One of his best known private students was jazz trumpet player, Jon Faddis.

Early life 
Billy Catalano, Jr. was born on July 9, 1934, in San Francisco, California.

Growing up part of a legendary musical family, Catalano was surrounded by extremely talented musicians. His uncles, Frankie, Johnny, and Leo Catalano, were multi-instrumentalists who could play any standard in any key. Along with his father, drummer Bill Catalano, Sr., they would bring the young trumpet player to their gigs and challenge him to follow their lead in a constant trial by fire. By the age of 15, Catalano had already played hundreds of professional gigs, which ingrained a knowledge of the Great American Songbook that he would use in decades to follow.

After attending James Denman Middle School and Balboa High School in the late 1940s through early 1950s, Catalano attended and graduated from San Francisco State University. He was part of the first class that relocated the college's campus from its location at Buchanan and Haight streets to its current location near Lake Merced.

Trumpet playing and musical contracting 
In May 1957, Catalano joined Stan Kenton's band, playing in the trumpet section alongside Ed Leddy, Lee Katzman, Sam Noto, and Phil Gilbert.

As a youth, Catalano idolized Kenton and his trumpet players. Kenton had significant impact on Billy's life as a band leader and, later, teacher. "As a leader, Stan would really zero in on the young guys and lift them up constantly. For instance, he'd say to me, 'Billy, you're going to be my next Al Porcino. Now look at the back of that ballroom and just make noise!'"

After touring the United States with Kenton, he returned to his hometown and remained first call on the music scene, playing every nightclub and casual music venue throughout the city and San Francisco Bay Area. During this period, Catalano also established being one of San Francisco's busiest musical contractors. In two decades, he hired hundreds of local musicians for productions such as the Ice Follies, the Grand National Rodeo, Nureyev and Fonteyn's Ballet Tour at the War Memorial Opera House, and international shows brought to the Bay Area by renowned producer, Terry Terajima. Billy served as musical contractor for numerous high profile artists, such as Marlene Dietrich, Harry Belafonte, Tex Beneke, Bette Midler, and Tony Bennett, when they performed in San Francisco.

Teaching 
Interspersed with a playing career that spanned 60 years, Catalano taught and inspired a multitude of young musicians. One of his most notable trumpet students is Jon Faddis, whom he met while teaching at Best Music in Oakland, California after his short tenure with Kenton.

Jon Faddis: "Well, Bill Catalano was very, very special, in that he exposed me to live jazz playing at a very young age. And at that time, this in the early sixties, you had to be 21 to go in a lot of the clubs. But, he would take me to rehearsal bands in San Francisco after my lesson. We would go over to San Francisco and they would have rehearsals, and they would play, you know, Billy Byers charts, and Frank Foster charts."

"He would just sit me in the section, I'd be sitting with my horn, and he'd say, 'Okay, now when this comes up, play these four bars.' And I'd just play the four bars and I'd play along just keep out of the way, but I was hearing these great players play in these big bands from an early age."

He returned in the late 1970s to his alma maters, Balboa and Denman, to direct the bands and rebuild the instrumental music program at both schools.

As part of media coverage for a donation of musical instruments to Denman by Ronald McDonald House Charities of the Bay Area, Catalano was interviewed by the San Francisco Chronicle. The article became primarily focused on the "maestro of middle school": 
"Music doesn't come from the lips. Music comes from someplace else, someplace more truthful than most lips. 'Lips don't play anything,' said Bill Catalano, the maestro of middle school, laying down his baton to impart a great truth. 'You're the one that plays. Not the instrument, the lips, the mouth or the fingers. You.' He leaned forward and grabbed his gut. 'Play from here,' he said."

Retirement and cancer 
After four years of battling throat and lung cancer, he decided to retire from teaching in 2003. Despite the loss of a quarter of his lungs from surgery, Billy never stopped playing his trumpet daily. His dedication to music and playing his horn was evident up to two weeks before he passed on July 15, 2005.

Discography 
From Bill Catalano on Discogs

References 

American jazz trumpeters
1934 births
2005 deaths